is a district located in Hidaka Subprefecture, Hokkaido, Japan.

As of 2010, the district has an estimated population of 5,862 and a density of 10.0 persons per km2. The total area is 585.88 km2.

Towns and villages 

Niikappu

Districts in Hokkaido